Dana Lewis Christensen (born May 23, 1951) is a United States district judge of the United States District Court for the District of Montana.

Education 
Christensen earned a Bachelor of Arts degree in 1973 from Stanford University and a Juris Doctor in 1976 from the University of Montana School of Law.

Professional career  

Christensen had worked in private practice at various firms in Montana since 1977. He was a civil litigator and a named partner at a firm in Kalispell, Montana from 1996 to 2011. Among other things, he worked in the area of insurance defense.

Federal judicial service 

On May 4, 2011, President Obama nominated Christensen to a seat on the United States District Court for the District of Montana that was vacated by Judge Donald W. Molloy, who assumed senior status in August 2011. Christensen's nomination was reported from the United States Senate Committee on the Judiciary on October 6, 2011. The Senate confirmed his nomination on December 5, 2011, by voice vote. He received his commission on December 6, 2011. He served as Chief Judge from March 19, 2013, to March 19, 2020.

In late August 2018, Christensen placed a 14-day hold on grizzly bear hunting in Wyoming and Idaho after the U.S. Fish and Wildlife Service  lifted federal protections for grizzlies in Yellowstone National Park areas in 2017.  On September 24, 2018, Christensen released a 48-page ruling restoring the protections and cancelling the hunts altogether, citing that Fish & Wildlife's analysis of the threats to grizzly bears was lacking and that they "failed to make a reasoned decision" in considering the impact of delisting the Yellowstone grizzlies from protected species status.

In September 2020, Christensen rejected requests by the Donald Trump campaign, Republican Party organizations, as well as Montana House Speaker Greg Hertz and Montana Senate President Scott Sales, seeking to block Montana Governor Steve Bullock from permitting counties in Montana to conduct voting by mail in the November 2020 General Election. Christensen ruled that Bullock could waive a state law prohibiting voting by mail, under statutory authority to waive certain state rules or regulations if adherence to them would cause harm during an emergency or disaster. Bullock claimed that preventing voting by mail during the COVID-19 pandemic would cause potential harm to people voting in person, and disenfranchise others by dissuading them from taking the risk of voting in person, rendering them unable to vote at all. Christensen cited precedent against changing the process of an election too close to the date of the election, or in ways that would render the election difficult to conduct. He further cited that the plaintiffs had not provided any evidence that voting by mail would lead to electoral fraud, and noted that plaintiffs were forced to admit that there had not been a single documented case of voter fraud in Montana in the previous twenty years.

References

External links

1951 births
Living people
20th-century American lawyers
21st-century American judges
21st-century American lawyers
Judges of the United States District Court for the District of Montana
Montana lawyers
Stanford University alumni
United States district court judges appointed by Barack Obama
University of Montana alumni